Neffelsee (also Naturschutzsee Füssenich) is a lake in Zülpich, North Rhine-Westphalia, Germany. With a depth of 28 m, its surface area is 65 ha.

Lakes of North Rhine-Westphalia
LFussenich